ANSI C, ISO C, and Standard C are successive standards for the C programming language published by the American National Standards Institute (ANSI) and ISO/IEC JTC 1/SC 22/WG 14 of the International Organization for Standardization (ISO) and the International Electrotechnical Commission (IEC).  Historically, the names referred specifically to the original and best-supported version of the standard (known as C89 or C90).  Software developers writing in C are encouraged to conform to the standards, as doing so helps portability between compilers.

History and outlook
The first standard for C was published by ANSI. Although this document was subsequently adopted by ISO/IEC and subsequent revisions published by ISO/IEC have been adopted by ANSI, "ANSI C" is still used to refer to the standard. While some software developers use the term ISO C, others are standards-body neutral and use Standard C.

Standardizing C
In 1983, the American National Standards Institute formed a committee, X3J11, to establish a standard specification of C. In 1985, the first Standard Draft was released, sometimes referred to as C85. In 1986, another Draft Standard was released, sometimes referred to as C86. The prerelease Standard C was published in 1988, and sometimes referred to as C88.

C89
The ANSI standard was completed in 1989 and ratified as ANSI X3.159-1989 "Programming Language C." This version of the language is often referred to as "ANSI C". Later on sometimes the label "C89" is used to distinguish it from C90 but using the same labeling method.

C90
The same standard as C89 was ratified by ISO/IEC as ISO/IEC 9899:1990, with only formatting changes, which is sometimes referred to as C90. Therefore, the terms "C89" and "C90" refer to essentially the same language.

This standard has been withdrawn by both ANSI/INCITS and ISO/IEC.

C95
In 1995, the ISO/IEC published an extension, called Amendment 1, for the ANSI-C standard. Its full name finally was ISO/IEC 9899:1990/AMD1:1995 or nicknamed C95. Aside from error correction there were further changes to the language capabilities, such as:

 Improved multi-byte and wide character support in the standard library, introducing <wchar.h> and <wctype.h> as well as multi-byte I/O
 Addition of digraphs to the language
 Specification of standard macros for the alternative specification of operators, e.g. and for &&
 Specification of the standard macro __STDC_VERSION__

In addition to the amendment, two technical corrigenda were published by ISO for C90:

 ISO/IEC 9899:1990/Cor 1:1994 TCOR1 in 1994
 ISO/IEC 9899:1990/Cor 2:1996 in 1996

Preprocessor test for C95 compatibility
#if defined(__STDC_VERSION__) && __STDC_VERSION__ >= 199409L

/* C95 compatible source code. */
#elif defined()
/* C89 compatible source code. */
#endif

C99

In March 2000, ANSI adopted the ISO/IEC 9899:1999 standard. This standard is commonly referred to as C99. Some notable additions to the previous standard include:

 New built-in data types: long long, _Bool, _Complex, and _Imaginary
 Several new core language features, including static array indices, designated initializers, compound literals, variable-length arrays, flexible array members, variadic macros, and restrict keyword
 Several new library headers, including stdint.h, <tgmath.h>, fenv.h, <complex.h>
 Improved compatibility with several C++ features, including inline functions, single-line comments with //, mixing declarations and code, and universal character names in identifiers
 Removed several dangerous C89 language features such as implicit function declarations and implicit int

Three technical corrigenda were published by ISO for C99:

 ISO/IEC 9899:1999/Cor 1:2001(E)
 ISO/IEC 9899:1999/Cor 2:2004(E)
 ISO/IEC 9899:1999/Cor 3:2007(E), notable for deprecating the standard library function gets

This standard has been withdrawn by both ANSI/INCITS and ISO/IEC in favour of C11.

C11

C11 was officially ratified and published on December 8, 2011. Notable features include improved Unicode support, type-generic expressions using the new _Generic keyword, a cross-platform multi-threading API (threads.h), and atomic types support in both core language and the library (stdatomic.h).

One technical corrigendum has been published by ISO for C11:

 ISO/IEC 9899:2011/Cor 1:2012

C17

, "C17" is the current standard for the C programming language.

C17 addresses defects in C11 without introducing new language features.

C2x 

C2x is an informal name for the next (after C17) major C language standard revision.

Other related ISO publications
As part of the standardization process, ISO/IEC also publishes technical reports and specifications related to the C language:

 ISO/IEC TR 19769:2004, on library extensions to support Unicode transformation formats, integrated into C11
 ISO/IEC TR 24731-1:2007, on library extensions to support bounds-checked interfaces, integrated into C11
 ISO/IEC TR 18037:2008, on embedded C extensions
 ISO/IEC TR 24732:2009, on decimal floating point arithmetic, superseded by ISO/IEC TS 18661-2:2015
 ISO/IEC TR 24747:2009, on special mathematical functions,
 ISO/IEC TR 24731-2:2010, on library extensions to support dynamic allocation functions
 ISO/IEC TS 17961:2013, on secure coding in C
 ISO/IEC TS 18661-1:2014, on IEC 60559:2011-compatible binary floating-point arithmetic
 ISO/IEC TS 18661-2:2015, on IEC 60559:2011-compatible decimal floating point arithmetic
 ISO/IEC TS 18661-3:2015, on IEC 60559:2011-compatible interchange and extended floating-point types
 ISO/IEC TS 18661-4:2015, on IEC 60559:2011-compatible supplementary functions
More technical specifications are in development and pending approval, including the fifth and final part of TS 18661, a software transactional memory specification, and parallel library extensions.

Support from major compilers
ANSI C is now supported by almost all the widely used compilers. GCC and Clang are two major C compilers popular today, both are based on the C11 with updates including changes from later specifications such as C17 and C18. Any source code written only in standard C and without any hardware dependent assumptions is virtually guaranteed to compile correctly on any platform with a conforming C implementation.  Without such precautions, most programs may compile only on a certain platform or with a particular compiler, due, for example, to the use of non-standard libraries, such as GUI libraries, or to the reliance on compiler- or platform-specific attributes such as the exact size of certain data types and byte endianness.

Compliance detectability

 #if defined() && 
 extern int getopt(int, char * const *, const char *);
 #else
 extern int getopt();
 #endif

In the above example, a prototype is used in a function declaration for ANSI compliant implementations, while an obsolescent non-prototype declaration is used otherwise. Those are still ANSI-compliant as of C99. Note how this code checks both definition and evaluation: this is because some implementations may set  to zero to indicate non-ANSI compliance.

Compiler support 
List of compilers supporting ANSI C:
 Amsterdam Compiler Kit (C K&R and C89/90)
 ARM RealView
 Clang, using LLVM backend
 GCC (full C89/90, C99 and C11)
 HP C/ANSI C compiler (C89 and C99)
 IBM XL C/C++ (C11, starting with version 12.1)
 Intel's ICC
 LabWindows/CVI
 LCC
 OpenWatcom (C89/90 and some C99)
 Microsoft Visual C++ (C89/90 and some C99)
 Pelles C (C99 and C11. Windows only.)
 vbcc (C89/90 and C99)
 Tiny C Compiler (C89/90 and some C99)
 Oracle Developer Studio

See also

 Behavioral Description Language
 Compatibility of C and C++
 C++23, C++20, C++17, C++14, C++11, C++03, C++98, versions of the C++ programming language standard
 C++ Technical Report 1

References

Further reading

External links 
 ISO C working group
 Draft ANSI C Standard (ANSI X3J11/88-090) (May 13, 1988), Third Public Review
 Draft ANSI C Rationale (ANSI X3J11/88-151) (Nov 18, 1988)
 C Information Bulletin #1 (ANSI X3J11/93-007) (May 27, 1992)
 ANSI C Yacc grammar
 ANSI C grammar, Lex specification
 
 

American National Standards Institute standards
C (programming language)
Programming language standards